Statistics of Emperor's Cup in the 1983 season.

Overview
It was contested by 28 teams, and Nissan Motors won the championship.

Results

1st round
Fukushima FC 0–5 Fujitsu
Nippon Steel 2–2 (PK 2–3) Teijin
Tanabe Pharmaceuticals 1–7 Nissan Motors
Yomiuri 4–0 Aichi Gakuin University
Waseda University 0–2 Yamaha Motors
Niigata Eleven 1–9 Osaka University of Health and Sport Sciences
Nippon Kokan 4–0 Sapporo University
Honda 4–2 Toshiba
Sumitomo Metals 2–1 Hitachi
Mazda 5–0 Fukuoka University
Matsushita Electric 3–1 Kawasaki Steel Mizushima
Osaka University of Commerce 2–1 Daikyo Oil

2nd round
Mitsubishi Motors 1–2 Fujitsu
Teijin 1–4 Nissan Motors
Yomiuri 1–0 Yamaha Motors
Osaka University of Health and Sport Sciences 1–1 (PK 1–3) Fujita Industries
Furukawa Electric 2–3 Nippon Kokan
Honda 3–0 Sumitomo Metals
Mazda 2–0 Matsushita Electric
Osaka University of Commerce 0–0 (PK 2–3) Yanmar Diesel

Quarterfinals
Fujitsu 0–6 Nissan Motors
Yomiuri 0–0 (PK 2–4) Fujita Industries
Nippon Kokan 2–1 Honda
Mazda 2–3 Yanmar Diesel

Semifinals
Nissan Motors 3–2 Fujita Industries
Nippon Kokan 0–1 Yanmar Diesel

Final

Nissan Motors 2–0 Yanmar Diesel
Nissan Motors won the championship.

References
 NHK

Emperor's Cup
Emperor's Cup
1984 in Japanese football